Polish Legends, also known as Polish Tales, is a Polish-language science fiction and fantasy short film series, produced by Allegro and Platige Image. It was directed by Tomasz Bagiński, and written by Błażej Dzikowski and Dominik L. Marzec. In the production also worked Marcin Kobylecki, Łukasz Alwast, Krzysztof Noworyta, Tobiasz Piątkowski, Jan Pomierny, and Marta Staniszewska. The series include 5 short films, that premiered in 2015 and 2016, on YouTube. It is based on Polish legends and folk tales, including: Sir Twardowski, Wawel Dragon, Basilisk, and Baba Yaga.

Cast 
Robert Więckiewicz as Jan Twardowsky
Aleksandra Kasprzyk as devil woman
Kim Kold as Wawel Dragon
Tomasz Włosok as Janek Szewczyk
Vanessa Aleksander as Ola
Tomasz Drabek as Boruta
Piotr Machalica as Rokita
Paweł Domagała as Boguś Kołodziej
Olaf Lubaszenko as Eugeniusz Bardacha
Michalina Olszańska as Rzepicha
Katarzyna Pośpiech as Yaga
Jerzy Stuhr as St. Mary's Trumpet Call performer
Małgorzata Mikołajczak as the female robot

Short films

Feature film 
In May 2018, it was announced that Tomasz Bagiński would direct a feature film set in the universe of Polish Legends, titled Twardowsky 3.14. It was set to continue the story of the main characters from the shorts. It was announced that the movie would most likely premiere in late 2019, however, it never happened.

Music videos 
There were several song covers made for the project. Each song had its own music video set in the universe of the short series. The songs were:
 Aleja Gwiazd by Matheo and Anna Karwan (23 September 2016)
 Mój jest ten kawałek podłogi by Matheo and Andrzej Donarski (16 November 2016)
 Jaskółka uwięziona by Atanas Valkov and Georgina Tarasiuk (16 December 2016)
 Cichosza by Marcin Macuk and Krzysztof Zalewski (6 June 2017)
 Jezu jak się cieszę by Atanas Valkov and Skubas (11 July 2017)
 Kocham wolność by Matheo and Damian Ukeje (8 October 2017)

Books

Legendy Polskie 
An anthology titled Legendy Polskie, which consists of stories based on the Polish legends and folk tales, has been published on 30 November 2015 by Allegro. The stories were written by: Elżbieta Cherezińska, Rafał Kosik, Jakub Małecki, Łukasz Orbitowski, Radek Rak, Robert Wegner. The stories are:
 Spójrz mi w oczy by Elżbieta Cherezińska, inspired by the Basilisk,
 Śnięci rycerze by Rafał Kosik, inspired by the Dreaming Knights,
 Zwyczajny gigant by Jakub Małecki, inspired by Sir Twardowski,
 Niewidzialne by Łukasz Orbitowski, inspired by the Water of Life,
 Kwiaty paproci by Radek Rak, inspired by the fern flower,
 Milczenie owcy by Robert Wegner, inspired by the Wawel Dragon.

The book was originally published as an ebook, however in 2018, the paper version has been also published.

Wywiad z Borutą 
The book Wywiad z Borutą written by Łukasz Orbitowski and Michał Cetnarowski, has been published in June 2016 by Allegro. It is set in the universe of the shorts. The authors have been awarded the Janusz A. Zajdel Award for the book. It was originally published as an ebook, and in 2018, it was also published in the paper version. It has an audiobook version, recorded by Krystyna Janda and Tomasz Drabek.

Reception 
The shorts were met with a positive reaction by the viewers, with the first two shorts, Twardowsky and The Dragon, gaining 6 million views in the first few weeks after their premiere.

Citations

Notes

References 

Polish science fiction films
Polish short films
Short film series
Science fiction film series
2015 science fiction films
2016 science fiction films
Fantasy film series
2015 fantasy films
2016 fantasy films
Films based on Slavic mythology
Polish web series
2015 web series debuts
2016 web series endings
Moon in film
Films set in outer space
Films set in Kraków
Films set in Poland